Hedvig Eleonora Parish is a parish in Östermalm's church district (kontrakt) in the Diocese of Stockholm, Sweden. The parish is located in Stockholm Municipality in Stockholm County. The parish forms its own pastorship.

History
The parish was formed on 17 April 1672, by an outbreak from the Holmkyrkan Parish (Holmkyrkans församling). Until 1737, the parish was also called the Ladugårdsland Parish (Ladugårdslands församling) and has also been called the Östermalm Parish (Östermalms församling). In 1724 and 1749, the Borgerskapets änkhus församling and Hedvig Eleonora fattighus församling broke out, respectively. In 1819, the Djurgårdens landsförsamling broke out, but returned in 1868. On 1 May 1906, Engelbrekt Parish and Oscar Parish were broken out. The parish has formed and constitutes its own pastorship with the exception of the period from 1819 to 1868 when it was the head parish of the pastorship of Hedvig Eleonora och Djurgårdens landsförsamling.

Location
Hedvig Eleonora Parish belongs to Östermalm's church district (kontrakt) which also includes Oscar and Engelbrekt parishes. The parish consists of the central part of the district of Östermalm and is geographically small, a few blocks between Valhallavägen in the north, Strandvägen with the Royal Dramatic Theatre in the south, Skeppargatan in the east and Brahegatan in the west. The only church of the parish, Hedvig Eleonora Church, founded in 1669 and inaugurated in 1737, is located at Östermalm square, where also Östermalmshallen, the Swedish Army Museum, Stockholm Music Museum, and the Royal Stables are located. The church is Östermalm's oldest church and was the main church until Östermalm was divided into three parishes in 1906.

On 1 January 1976, Hedvig Eleonora Parish covered an area of 0.6 square kilometers, of which 0.6 square kilometer was land.

Vicars
 1647–1697: Jonas Gravnader
 1697–1709: Abraham Alcinius
 1711–1715: Georg Wallberg
 1719–1731: Michael Hermonius
 1731–1738: Olof Hökerstedt
 1738–1757: Johan Göstaf Hallman
 1758–1766: Anders Carl Rutström
 1767–1777: Johan Stenbeck
 1779–1791: Olof Eneroth Olofsson
 1802–1820: Lars Peter Widing
 1822–1852: Mårten Christoffer Bergvall
 1853–1881: Per Lindsten
 1883–1885: Ernst Julius Östrand
 1888–1908: Gustaf Oskar Lagerström
 1910–1933: Josef Källander
 1934–1964: Erik Bergman
 1964–1977: Hans Åkerhielm af Blombacka
 1977–1987: Erik Albertson
 1987–1998: Arne Broberg
 1998–2006: Olof Sjöholm
 2006–2008: Cecilia Melder
 2008–present: Sven Milltoft

References

External links

Parishes of the Church of Sweden
Diocese of Stockholm (Church of Sweden)